Stephen Fernandez is a Filipino taekwondo practitioner and coach. He competed at the 1992 Summer Olympics in Barcelona where he won a bronze medal in taekwondo, considered a demonstration event for that edition.

Fernandez was the senior Deputy Chef de Mission for the Philippine delegation at the 2019 Southeast Asian Games.  He is the Deputy Secretary General, as well, of the Philippine Taekwondo Association. He was a coach for the taekwondo team of the De La Salle University for 24 years.

References

Living people
Filipino martial artists
Filipino male taekwondo practitioners
De La Salle University alumni
Sportspeople from Metro Manila
Olympic taekwondo practitioners of the Philippines
Filipino sportsperson-politicians
Nacionalista Party politicians
Southeast Asian Games medalists in taekwondo
Filipino sports executives and administrators
Competitors at the 1987 Southeast Asian Games
Taekwondo practitioners at the 1992 Summer Olympics

Year of birth missing (living people)
Taekwondo practitioners at the 1986 Asian Games
20th-century Filipino people